Rumiñawi (Kichwa for "stone eye", "stone face", "rock eye" or "rock face") may refer to:

 Rumiñahui Canton
 Rumiñawi (Inca warrior)
 Rumiñawi (volcano)